The 2001 IIHF Women's World Championships was held April 2–8, 2001 in six cities in the state of Minnesota. Venues included the Ice Center in Plymouth, the Mariucci Arena in Minneapolis, the Recreation Centre in Rochester, the Herb Brooks National Hockey Center in St. Cloud, the Columbia Arena in Fridley, and the Schwan Super Rink, in Blaine. Team Canada won their seventh consecutive gold medal at the World Championships defeating the United States. Russia upset Finland 2–1 to capture their first medal in women's hockey.

Teams

With the promotion and relegation format now in use, the top seven nations were joined by Kazakhstan, the winner of Group B in 2000.

World Championship Group A

The eight participating teams were divided up into two seeded groups as below. The teams played each other once in a single round robin format. The top two teams from the group proceeded to the Final Round, while the remaining teams played in the Consolation Round.

First round

Group A

Standings

Results
All times local

Group B

Standings

Results
All times local

Playoff round

Consolation round 5–8 place

Consolation round 7–8 place

Consolation round 5–6 place

Final round

Semifinals

Match for third place

Final

Champions

Scoring leaders

Goaltending leaders

Final standings

Rosters

World Championship Division I

Directorate Awards
 Goalie: Kim St-Pierre (Canada)
 Defender: Karyn Bye (United States)
 Forward: Jennifer Botterill (Canada)
 Most Valuable Player: Jennifer Botterill (Canada)

References

External links
 Summary from the Women's Hockey Net
 Detailed summary from passionhockey.com 
 

 
World
2001
IIHF Women's World Ice Hockey Championships
World
April 2001 sports events in the United States
Women's ice hockey competitions in the United States
2001 in sports in Minnesota
Ice hockey competitions in Minneapolis
Sports in Rochester, Minnesota
Sports in St. Cloud, Minnesota
2000s in Minneapolis
Plymouth, Minnesota
Fridley, Minnesota
Sports in Blaine, Minnesota
Women's sports in Minnesota